Improvement District No. 9 (Banff), or Improvement District No. 9, is an improvement district in Alberta, Canada. Coextensive with Banff National Park in Alberta's Rockies, the improvement district is the municipality that provides local government for the portion of the park outside the Town of Banff.

History 
Improvement District (I.D.) No. 9 was originally formed as I.D. No. 51 on April 1, 1945 through the amalgamation of I.D. Nos. 224, 255, 285, and 317, as well as portions of I.D. Nos. 193, 223, 253, 254, 284, 314, 315, 316, 347, 348, and 378. I.D. No. 51 was renumbered to I.D. No. 9 on January 1, 1969.

Formerly part of I.D. No. 9, Banff separated from the improvement district and incorporated as a town on January 1, 1990.

Geography

Communities and localities 
 
The following urban municipalities are surrounded by Improvement District No. 9:
Cities
none
Towns
Banff
Villages
none
Summer villages
none

The following hamlets are located within Improvement District No. 9:
Hamlets
Lake Louise

The following localities are located within Improvement District No. 9:
Localities 
Anthracite
Bankhead
Castle Junction
Castle Mountain
Duthil
Eldon
Massive
Saskatchewan River Crossing
Sawback
Temple
Other places
Georgetown

Demographics 

Government 
Like all improvements districts in Alberta, Improvement District (I.D.) No. 9 is administered by Alberta Municipal Affairs. However, residents of I.D. No. 9 do elect an advisory council consisting of a chairperson and four councillors to oversee the activities of municipal staff.

See also 
List of communities in Alberta

References 

1945 establishments in Alberta
Banff National Park
 
09